The February 2022 European Masters (officially the 2022 BetVictor European Masters) was a professional ranking snooker tournament that took place from 21 to 27 February 2022 at the Marshall Arena in Milton Keynes, England. The tournament was the 11th ranking event of the 2021–22 season and the sixth of eight tournaments in the season's European Series. The World Snooker Tour originally planned to stage the event at the Stadthalle Fürth in Fürth, Germany, but relocated it to the UK after increasing rates of COVID-19 in Bavaria led to greater restrictions around sporting events. The tournament was broadcast by Eurosport in Europe, and by other networks worldwide. 

Mark Selby was the defending champion, having defeated Martin Gould 9–8 in the final of the tournament's September 2020 edition. However, Selby lost 3–5 to Jordan Brown in the round of 64. Many other top seeds also suffered early exits, with only three top-16 players reaching the round of 16. World number 80 Fan Zhengyi reached his first ranking final by defeating higher-ranked opponents Kyren Wilson, Yan Bingtao, David Gilbert, and Graeme Dott. Six-time world champion Ronnie O'Sullivan reached the 60th ranking final of his career. 

The best-of-19-frame final between O'Sullivan and Fan was played over two sessions on 27 February. O'Sullivan fell two frames behind at 2–4, 4–6, and 6–8, but drew level each time. Fan took a 9–8 lead, but O'Sullivan again drew level to force a deciding frame. After O'Sullivan missed a long red in the decider, Fan made a 92 break to win the match 10–9 and capture his first ranking title. He became the fifth Chinese player to win a ranking event, after Ding Junhui, Liang Wenbo, Yan, and Zhao Xintong, as well as the fourth player to win a maiden ranking title in the 2021–22 season, following David Gilbert, Zhao, and Hossein Vafaei. His £80,000 prize money for winning the tournament took him from 80th to 31st in the world rankings.

Thepchaiya Un-Nooh made the highest break of the tournament, a 144, during his qualifying match against Chen Zifan. Neil Robertson compiled a record-equalling four consecutive centuries in his last-64 match against Alfie Burden, becoming the first player to accomplish this feat twice in professional competition. He previously made four consecutive centuries against Ahmed Saif at a European Tour event in 2013.

Prize fund
The breakdown of prize money for this event is shown below:

 Winner: £80,000
 Runner-up: £35,000
 Semi-final: £17,500
 Quarter-final: £11,000
 Last 16: £6,000
 Last 32: £4,000
 Last 64: £3,000
 Highest break: £5,000
 Total: £407,000

Main draw

Top half

Bottom half

Final

Qualifying 
Qualifying for the event took place between 27 and 31 October 2021 at the Chase Leisure Centre in Cannock, England. Qualifying matches involving the top four ranked players were held over to be played at the Marshall Arena in Milton Keynes.

Mark Williams was due to take part in qualifying, but withdrew from the event due to a positive COVID-19 test and was replaced by Mark Lloyd. Sam Craigie withdrew due to injury, and his place in the draw was taken by James Cahill. However, Cahill immediately had to withdraw after producing a positive COVID-19 test. As no other players were available to be entered at short notice, Soheil Vahedi received a bye. Michael White also withdrew and was replaced by Simon Blackwell.

 (1) 5–3 
 5–2 
 (32) 5–0 
 4–5 
 (16) 5–2 
 2–5 
 (17) 5–3 
 5–3 
 5–1 
 (24) 5–1 
 3–5 
 (9) 4–5 
 5–1 
 (25) 5–2 
 w/d–w/o 
 (8) 1–5 
 (5) 5–2 
 5–4 
 (28) 4–5 
 5–3 
 (12) 5–2 
 3–5 
 (21) 5–4 
 5–3 
 0–5 
 (20) 5–4 
 5–3 
 (13) 5–0 
 5–1 
 (29) 4–5 
 5–0 
 (4) 5–2 
 (3) 5–1 
 3–5 
 (30) 4–5 
 3–5 
 (14) 5–2 
 1–5 
 (19) 5–2 
 5–0 
 2–5 
 (22) 5–0 
 5–4 
 (11) 3–5 
 1–5 
 (27) 5–3 
 5–3 
 (6) 5–4 
 (7) 5–2 
 5–0 
 (26) 5–2 
 2–5 
 4–5 
 3–5 
 (23) 5–4 
 0–5 
 4–5 
 (18) 5–3 
 0–5 
 (15) 5–0 
 0–5 
 (31) 5–2 
 5–2 
 (2) 5–0

Century breaks

Main stage centuries

A total of 60 century breaks were made during the main event.

 141, 136, 132, 128, 127, 112, 109, 109, 107, 105  Ronnie O'Sullivan
 140, 131, 124, 120  Liang Wenbo
 135, 131, 125, 117, 110  Fan Zhengyi
 134, 134, 124  Anthony McGill
 132  Gary Wilson
 131  Jamie Jones
 130  Jack Lisowski
 128, 115  Jak Jones
 128  Mark Selby
 128  Xiao Guodong
 127  Tom Ford
 127  Andrew Higginson
 124, 100  Judd Trump
 122  Noppon Saengkham
 118  Jordan Brown
 117  Ryan Day
 116, 107, 105, 104, 101, 100  Neil Robertson
 114  Ricky Walden
 114  Zhang Anda
 112, 100  Wu Yize
 111, 105, 103  Kurt Maflin
 111  Yan Bingtao
 110, 101  Pang Junxu
 109  Jackson Page
 105, 100  David Gilbert
 102  Yuan Sijun
 101, 100  Kyren Wilson
 101  Luca Brecel
 101  Stuart Carrington
 101  Soheil Vahedi

Qualifying stage centuries

A total of 40 century breaks were made during the qualifying stage of the tournament.

 144  Thepchaiya Un-Nooh
 141, 131  Ryan Day
 141  Kurt Maflin
 138  Mark Davis
 138  Jack Lisowski
 136  Mark Allen
 136  Lu Ning
 135  Sunny Akani
 134, 127  Shaun Murphy
 134, 106  Xu Si
 134  Liam Highfield
 132  Yuan Sijun
 131  Ken Doherty
 130  Neil Robertson
 129  Elliot Slessor
 129  Judd Trump
 128  Mark Selby
 123  John Higgins
 122  Jamie Clarke
 120  Mitchell Mann
 118  Jordan Brown
 117  Graeme Dott
 115  Michael Holt
 113  Matthew Selt
 112  Ashley Hugill
 112  Zhang Anda
 111  Mark Lloyd
 110  Zhao Jianbo
 108, 104  Barry Hawkins
 108  David Grace
 104, 100  David Gilbert
 102  Noppon Saengkham
 101  Jackson Page
 101  Ben Woollaston

Notes

References 

2022
European Masters (1)
European Masters (1)
European Masters
Sport in Milton Keynes
Snooker competitions in England
European Series